The Nanuchka class, Soviet designation Project 1234 Ovod, are series of corvettes (small missile ships in Soviet classification) built for the Soviet Navy and export customers between 1969 and 1991.

Variants

These ships were designed around the P-120 Malakhit ("Siren") anti ship missile. Export versions used the P-15 Termit ("Styx") missile. In 2019 the missiles on Smerch were replaced with sixteen Uran/SS-N-25 'Switchblade'. Unlike smaller missile boats, both carry SA-N-4 ("Gecko") SAMs for self-defence. The original Nanuchka I carried a twin 57mm AK-257 main gun, replaced by a 76mm AK-176 in the Nanuchka III and an updated AK-176MA was added to Smerch during the refit. The Nanuchka III also has a rotary 30mm AK-630 point-defence gun to bolster its protection against missile attack. Currently Project 12341 ships are receiving BAGIRA Fire Control System turning them into multirole vessels.

Operational history
Reportedly the Mirazh, a Nanuchka III corvette, sank a Georgian vessel during an attempted attack on Russian ships off Abkhazia on 10 August 2008.

Operators
 
Nanuchka I (Project 1234) - 17 boats - retired in the 1990s, except Musson which was sunk in error by an SSM during an exercise in 1987 (39 fatalities).
Nanuchka III (Project 12341) - 16 boats - 6-8 in service with the Russian Navy as of 2022 (4 Baltic, 1-3 Pacific, 1 Northern).
Nanuchka IV (Project 12347) - 1 boat Nakat - retired in 2012. Trial vessel for P-800 Oniks ASHM.

Nanuchka II (Project 1234E) - 3 ships delivered in 1980-81, still in service.

Nanuchka II (Project 1234E) - 3 ships known as the Durg class, last ship decommissioned in 2004.

Nanuchka II (Project 1234E) - 4 ships delivered in 1982-85. 3 ships were lost during various incidents. 1 ship Tariq Ibn Ziyad still in service 

 Libyan People's Army
Nanuchka II (Project 1234E) - 1 ship Tariq Ibn Ziyad was captured in 2011 from the Libyan Navy. The ship was returned to Libyan Navy after the civil war.

Ships

Project 1234 (Nanuchka I)

Project 1234E (Nanuchka II)

Project 12341 (Nanuchka III)

Project 12347 (Nanuchka IV)

See also
List of ships of the Soviet Navy
List of ships of Russia by project number

References

Other sources
  Also published as

Gallery 

 
Corvette classes
Cold War corvettes of the Soviet Union
Corvettes of the Soviet Navy
Corvettes of the Russian Navy
Corvettes of the Algerian National Navy
Corvettes of the Indian Navy
Corvettes of the Libyan Navy